Raymond Ranger (born 16 July 1957) is a South African former cricketer. He played in 29 first-class and 12 List A matches for Border from 1976/77 to 1992/93.

See also
 List of Border representative cricketers

References

External links
 

1957 births
Living people
South African cricketers
Border cricketers
People from Stutterheim
Cricketers from the Eastern Cape